The 2015 National Games of India, also known as the 35th National Games of India and informally as Kerala 2015, was held from 31 January 2015 to 14 February 2015 across seven districts of Kerala, India. It was the second time that Kerala hosted the national games, the first being when it hosted the 27th National Games in 1987.

The opening ceremony took place at Greenfield Stadium, on 31 January 2015 at 6.00 PM. Union Minister of Urban Development, Shri Venkaiah Naidu inaugurated the opening ceremony.

Former cricketer Sachin Tendulkar was selected as the goodwill ambassador for the games.

Mascot

Ammu, the Great Hornbill (the state bird of Kerala) was chosen as the mascot, reflecting a concern for conservation as this is a species facing extinction. It is also an expression of the need to preserve Kerala's rain forests and regenerate the lost habitat of this precious bird. The choice of a feminine name for the mascot is a tribute to the women of Kerala.

Games Village
The Games Village is constructed based on the novel concept of prefabricated housing technology. The prefabricated housing would go well with the concept of Green Games as it is environmentally friendly, lightweight, energy efficient and faster to construct. One major advantage of this technology is that the individual housing units can be dismantled and relocated to other locations after the Games with additional cost in the form of steel Flashing / trims, civil foundation, internal electrification and plumbing, hardware, floor finish, wall cladding etc.

A total of 365 pre-fab houses occupying 5 athletes per room while team officials and coaches will be allocated single or double rooms. Social infrastructures such as kitchen, food courts, reception desks, medical centre, recreational zone, health club, open-air theatre, conference halls etc. are included in the Games Village. Apart from these, it also has house-keeping, solid waste management, security, clean water distribution facilities and even landscaping.

The Games Village is a ‘miniature India' as this venue is supposed to be the most vocal and visual representation of India's national integration at the Games.

Opening ceremony 
The opening ceremony was held at Greenfield Stadium, Thiruvananthapuram. Union Minister for Urban Development, Venkaiah Naidu declared the Games open in the presence of Kerala Chief Minister, Oommen Chandy, State Sports Minister, Thiruvanchoor Radhakrishnan, Union Minister of State for Sports, Sarbananda Sonowal, IOA president N. Ramachandran and the local M.P., Shashi Tharoor. The games torch, a cauldron shaped like a traditional Kerala lamp, was lit by athletes P. T. Usha and Anju Bobby George, and was passed to them by Sachin Tendulkar. The oath was taken on the behalf of the participants by the Kerala captain, Preeja Sreedharan.

Sports events
There are 33 sports disciplines in 2015 Kerala Games. Yachting is a newly included event. Aquatics (50 disciplines) and athletics (44 disciplines) were the biggest and most popular events in Kerala Games 2015; shooting (38 disciplines) became another big event.

Venues

Top 10 medal winners

Medals tally

The top ten ranked teams at the Games are listed below. The host state, Kerala, is highlighted.

Greening the National Games
The 2015 National Games was associated with green protocols. This was initiated by Suchitwa Mission, aiming for "zero-waste" venues. Waste Management programmes were implemented at all 29 venues. To make the event "disposable-free", a ban on the use of disposable water bottles was enforced. The event witnessed the usage of reusable tableware and stainless steel tumblers. Athletes were provided with refillable steel flasks. It is estimated that these green practices prevented the generation of about 120 metric tonnes of disposable waste. Suchitwa Mission requested the help of volunteers to achieve the green objectives, and the service of these 700 volunteers to achieve the green objectives were applauded by the Chief Minister.

References

External links
 

 
National Games of India
National Games of India
National Games of India
History of Kerala (1947–present)